The Taba Summit (also known as Taba Talks, Taba Conference or short Taba) were talks between Israel and the Palestinian Authority, held from 21 to 27 January 2001 at Taba, in the Sinai. The talks took place during a political transition period – Israeli Prime Minister Ehud Barak had resigned six weeks previously on 9 December 2000, and elections were due on 6 February 2001, and the inauguration of President George W. Bush had taken place just one day prior, on 20 January 2001.

They were peace talks aimed at enhancing the "final status" negotiations, to end the Israeli–Palestinian conflict. According to the statement issued by the negotiators at the end of the talks, they came closer to reaching a final settlement than in any previous peace talks. Prime Minister Ehud Barak's government terminated the talks on 27 January 2001 due to the upcoming Israeli election, and the new Sharon government did not restart them.

Background

The Taba Summit took place from 21 to 27 January 2001 at Taba, after the failed Camp David 2000 Summit between Prime Minister of Israel Ehud Barak and the Palestinian President Yasser Arafat, and against the backdrop of the Second Intifada that commenced. The parties had first negotiated at Bolling Air Force Base in Washington, hosted by President Bill Clinton from 19 to 23 December 2000. The Israelis under Foreign Minister Shlomo Ben-Ami, the Palestinian under senior negotiator Saeb Erekat, Minister Yasser Abed Rabbo and Gaza security chief Mohammed Dahlan attended the meeting. President Clinton presented bridging proposals (the so-called "Clinton Parameters"). A summit in Sharm el-Sheikh, mediated by Egyptian President Hosni Mubarak, was planned on 28 December. As the Palestinians delayed their acceptance of the Clinton Parameters, Barak decided not to go.

Positions

Israeli start positions
At the start of the Taba Summit, Israel held on three main points:
 no right of Palestinian refugees to return to inside the State of Israel
 no Palestinian sovereignty over the Temple Mount/Haram al-Sharif
 big settlement blocs (containing 80% of Jewish residents of the West Bank and Gaza) will be under Israeli sovereignty

The Moratinos non-paper
January 2001, the European Special Representative to the Middle East Process Miguel Moratinos presented a document, known as "The Moratinos non-paper," describing the outcome of the Taba negotiations. Although the paper has no official status, it has been acknowledged by the parties as being a relatively fair description of the outcome of the negotiations on the permanent status issues at Taba. It describes observed positions on the permanent status issues territory, Jerusalem, refugees and security, in order to find ways to come to joint positions. "At the same time it shows that there are serious gaps and differences between the two sides, which will have to be overcome in future negotiations." Summary of the paper:

Territory
The two sides agreed that in accordance with the UN Security Council Resolution 242, the 4 June 1967 lines would be the basis for the borders between Israel and the Palestinian state. Israel reduced its demands to 6% with territorial compensation that would offset about 3%, while the Palestinians proposed an Israeli annexation of about 3% along with a territorial compensation of the same amount. The Israeli proposal would have given the Palestinians some 97% of the land area of the West Bank.

West Bank
Both sides presented their own maps of the West Bank. The maps served as a basis for the discussion on territory and settlements. The Israeli side presented two maps, and the Palestinian side engaged on this basis. The Palestinian side presented some illustrative maps detailing its understanding of Israeli interests in the West Bank. The Israeli side stated that the Clinton proposals provide for annexation of Settlement blocs, areas which only had a small number of Palestinians. The Palestinian side did not agree that the parameters included blocs, and did not accept proposals to annex blocs. The Palestinian side stated that blocs would cause significant harm to the Palestinian interests and rights, particularly to the Palestinians residing in areas Israel sought to annex.

Gaza Strip
Neither side presented any maps of the Gaza Strip. It was implied that the Gaza Strip would be under total Palestinian sovereignty, but details still had to be worked out. All settlements would be evacuated. The Palestinian side claimed it could be arranged in 6 months, a timetable not agreed to by the Israeli side. Both sides agreed that there was going to be a safe passage from the north of Gaza (Beit Hanun) to the Hebron district, and that the West Bank and the Gaza Strip must be territorially linked.

Jerusalem
Both sides accepted in principle the Clinton suggestion of having a Palestinian sovereignty over Arab neighborhoods and an Israeli sovereignty over Jewish neighborhoods in Jerusalem. Both sides favored the idea of an open city. The Israeli side accepted that Jerusalem would be the capital of the two states: Yerushalaim, capital of Israel and Al-Quds, capital of the state of Palestine. Both parties accepted the principle of respective control over each side's respective holy sites. Israel's sovereignty over the Western Wall would be recognized although there remained a dispute regarding the delineation of the area covered by the Western Wall and especially the link to what is referred to in Clinton's ideas as the space sacred to Judaism of which it is part. Both sides agreed that the question of Haram al-Sharif/Temple Mount has not been resolved.

Refugees
Non-papers were exchanged which were regarded as a good basis for the talks. Both sides agreed to adopt the principles and references which could facilitate the adoption of an agreement. Both sides suggested, as a basis, that the parties should agree that a just settlement of the refugee problem in accordance with the UN Security Council Resolution 242 must lead to the implementation of UN General Assembly Resolution 194. The Israeli side expressed its understanding that the wish to return shall be implemented within the framework of one of the following programs:

A. Return and repatriation
 to Israel
 to Israeli swapped territory
 to the Palestinian state

B. Rehabilitation and relocation
 Rehabilitation in host country
 Relocation to third country

Both sides agreed that UNRWA should be phased out in accordance with an agreed timetable of five years, as a targeted period.

The Israeli side requested that the issue of compensation to Jewish immigrants from Arab countries be recognized, while accepting that it was not a Palestinian responsibility or a bilateral issue. The Palestinian side raised the issue of restitution of refugee property. The Israeli side rejected this.

Security
 The Israeli side requested to have 3 early warning stations on Palestinian territory.
 The Israeli side maintained that the Palestinian state would be non-militarized as per the Clinton proposals. The Palestinian side was prepared to accept limitation on its acquisition of arms, and be defined as a state with limited arms.
 The two sides recognized that the state of Palestine would have sovereignty over its airspace. The Israeli side agreed to accept and honor all Palestinian civil aviation rights according to international regulations, but sought a unified air control system under overriding Israel control. In addition, Israel requested access to Palestinian airspace for military operations and training.
 The Israeli side agreed to a withdrawal from the West Bank over a 36-month period with an additional 36 months for the Jordan Valley in conjunction with an international force. The Palestinian side rejected a 36-month withdrawal process from the West Bank expressing concern that a lengthy process would exacerbate Palestinian-Israeli tensions.
 The Israeli side requested to maintain and operate five emergency locations on potentially Palestinian territory (in the Jordan Valley) with the Palestinian response allowing for maximum of two emergency locations conditional on a time limit for the dismantling. The Palestinian side declined to agree to the deployment of Israeli armed forces on Palestinian territory during emergency situations, but was prepared to consider ways in which international forces might be used in that capacity, particularly within the context of regional security cooperation efforts.
 Both sides were prepared to commit themselves to promoting security cooperation and fighting terror.
 The Palestinian side was confident that Palestinian sovereignty over borders and international crossing points would be recognized in the agreement.

Positions mentioned in other sources
Israel wanted to keep military control over Palestinian land and airspace in states of emergency, not because of a possible future threat from Palestine, but because of possible other threats from the East. The Palestinians wanted to accept international forces only.

The Palestinians could not accept Israeli annexation of Giv'at Ze'ev and Ma'ale Adumim in the Jerusalem area. Israel wanted future expansion of the settlements into the West Bank. Unlike the Palestinians, Israel did not consider East Jerusalem part of the West Bank and its Israeli inhabitants settlers.

End of the negotiations

Official statement
The Taba Summit officially ended with a joint statement, that included some of the following points:

Reasons for impasse
The breakdown is often attributed to the political circumstances posed by Israeli elections and changeover in leadership in the United States: They had run out of political time. They couldn't conclude an agreement with Clinton now out of office and Barak standing for reelection in two weeks. "We made progress, substantial progress. We are closer than ever to the possibility of striking a final deal," said Shlomo Ben-Ami, Israel's negotiator. Saeb Erekat, Palestinian chief negotiator, said, "My heart aches because I know we were so close. We need six more weeks to conclude the drafting of the agreement."

Sharon Government's negation of the talks
The following month the Likud party candidate Ariel Sharon defeated Ehud Barak in the Israeli elections and was elected as Israeli prime minister on 6 February 2001. Sharon's new government chose not to resume the high-level talks. Immediately after the elections and before the change of government, an 8 February 2001 statement published by the Israeli Ministry of Foreign Affairs stated that:

Arafat accepts Taba peace plan 
In June 2002, The Guardian reported that Yasser Arafat accepted US president Bill Clinton’s Middle East peace plan. But the Israeli government said the offer was no longer on the table. In an Haaretz interview, each of the Taba proposals were put to Mr. Arafat, and he endorsed each of them.

See also
 List of Middle East peace proposals

References

External links
 The Moratinos non-paper, on unispal
 Israeli–Palestinian negotiations Dec. 2000 – Jan. 2001 (Includes links to texts of Israeli, United States and other press reports)
 "Trying to Understand the Taba Talks". David Matz, Palestine–Israel Journal of Politics, Economics and Culture. Vol.10 No.3 2003.
 Ariga.com
 2001 Taba Talks Examination
  Maps: Israeli proposals, from Camp David (2000) to Taba (2001)

Israeli–Palestinian peace process
Israel–United States relations
2001 in Israel
Diplomatic conferences in Egypt
21st-century diplomatic conferences (MENA)
2001 in international relations
2001 conferences
Yasser Arafat
2001 in the Palestinian territories
2001 in Egypt